This is the Day is an album released by Irish folk singer/songwriter Christy Moore in 2001.

It contains a tribute to Veronica Guerin, an Irish journalist who was murdered in 1996 by drug dealers.  Moore also covers the song "Victor Jara", a tribute to the Chilean folk singer with lyrics by Adrian Mitchell and music by Arlo Guthrie.  The song makes reference to the brutal murder of Jara during the Chilean coup of 1973.

Track listing 

"How Long" (Jackson Browne)
"So Do I" (Wally Page)
"Johnny Don't Go to Ballincollig" (John Spillane)
"Veronica" (Christy Moore, Declan Sinnott, Dónal Lunny)
"Jack Doyle" (aka "The Contender") (Jimmy McCarthy)
"Compañeros" (Ewan MacColl)
"Cry Like a Man" (Dan Penn)
"A Stitch in Time" (Mike Waterson)
"Victor Jara" (Adrian Mitchell, Arlo Guthrie)
"Scallcrows" (Moore, Sinnott, Lunny)
"The Pipers Path" (Chris Collins, Lal Waterson)

Personnel
Christy Moore - vocals, guitar
Declan Sinnott - acoustic and electric guitar, percussion, backing vocals
Dónal Lunny - bouzouki, bodhrán, keyboards, percussion, guitar, backing vocals

Weekly charts

Year-end charts

References

2001 albums
This is the Day (Christy Moore)